Diana Choyleva is an analyst and economist, specialising in China’s economy and politics.

Biography 
Choyleva was born in Bulgaria and moved to the United Kingdom after graduating in economics at Sofia University. She took an MA at the University of Warwick and then worked for Lombard Street Research for several years. In 2016 she started her own company, Enodo Economics, an independent macroeconomic forecasting consultancy firm focused on China. She writes opinion pieces for the Financial Times, the Wall Street Journal, Foreign Policy and Nikkei Asian Review, among others. She is a member of the Political Economy Club.

Publications 

 2011 - "The American Phoenix – and why China and Europe will struggle after the coming slump"  (co-authored with Charles Dumas) 
 2006 - "The Bill from the China Shop" , (co-authored with Charles Dumas)

References 

21st-century Bulgarian economists
Women economists

Living people
Year of birth missing (living people)
British journalists